Hudadalli is a village in the southern state of Karnataka, India It is located in Chincholi taluk of Kalaburagi district.

Demographics
 India census had a population of 838 with 424 males and 414 females.

Agriculture
Major Crops produced in the Dhotikol are Pigeon pea, Sorghum, Pearl millet, chickpea, mung bean, vigna mungo.

Transport
KSRTC bus facility is available to travel within the Karnataka state and Nabour states. The nearest railway station is (47 km) tandur railway station TDU. The nearest airport is (159 km) Rajiv Gandhi International Airport.

See also
 Gulbarga
 Districts of Karnataka

References

External links
 http://Gulbarga.nic.in

Villages in Kalaburagi district